In crystallography and the theory of infinite vertex-transitive graphs, the coordination sequence of a vertex  is an integer sequence that counts how many vertices are at each possible distance from . That is, it is a sequence

Coordination sequences can also be defined for sphere packings, by using either the contact graph of the spheres or the Delaunay triangulation of their centers, but these two choices may give rise to different sequences.

As an example, in a square grid, for each positive integer , there are  grid points that are  steps away from the origin. Therefore, the coordination sequence of the square grid is the sequence

in which, except for the initial value of one, each number is a multiple of four.

The concept was proposed by Georg O. Brunner and Fritz Laves and later developed by Michael O'Keefe. The coordination sequences of many low-dimensional lattices and uniform tilings are known.

References

Crystallography
Infinite graphs
Integer sequences